Baloney (Henry P.) is a children's picture book written by Jon Scieszka and illustrated by Lane Smith. It was published in 2001 by Viking Press.

Plot
The story is about an alien schoolchild who has an excellent reason for being late for school – he had blasted off into space.

About the text
The book encourages the reader to work out the meaning of a word from its context. The apparently alien words sprinkled throughout the text are actually from Earth languages.

References

2001 children's books
American picture books
Children's fiction books
Science fiction picture books